The Aero A.12 was a Czechoslovakian biplane light bomber and military reconnaissance aircraft manufactured in small numbers shortly after World War I. Although reminiscent of the Hansa-Brandenburg-designed aircraft that Aero was building during the war under licence as the Ae.10, the A.12 was the company's own design. It is perhaps most significant as the direct descendant of the highly successful A.11 and its various derivatives. An example of the type is preserved at the Letecké Muzeum in Kbely.

Operators

 Czechoslovakian Air Force.

Specifications (A.12)

See also

References

Further reading
 
 

1920s Czechoslovakian bomber aircraft
1920s Czechoslovakian military reconnaissance aircraft
A012
Single-engined tractor aircraft
Biplanes